Stephen Weaver Collins (born October 1, 1947) is an American former actor and writer. He is known for playing Eric Camden on the WB/CW television series 7th Heaven from 1996 to 2007. Afterwards, Collins played the roles of Dayton King on the ABC television series No Ordinary Family and Gene Porter in the NBC television series Revolution, father of Elizabeth Mitchell's character, Rachel Matheson. Before 7th Heaven, Collins was known for his role as Commander Willard Decker in the 1979 film Star Trek: The Motion Picture and the ABC television series Tales of the Gold Monkey.

In 2014, his career ended after he confessed to sexual misconduct against multiple minors.

Early life 
Stephen Collins was born on October 1, 1947, in Des Moines, Iowa, to mother Madeleine (née Robertson) and father Cyrus Stickney Collins, an airline executive. Collins was raised with his two older brothers in Hastings-on-Hudson, New York, and attended Amherst College in Massachusetts, graduating cum laude. While at Amherst, he played bass guitar in a number of bands.

Career 
Stephen Collins is known for his role as Eric Camden in the television drama series 7th Heaven during the series' run from 1996 to 2007 and for his role as Captain Willard Decker in Star Trek: The Motion Picture. His other notable television credits include Jake Cutter in the cult series Tales of the Gold Monkey and his role in Tattingers, as well as guest appearances in The Waltons, Barnaby Jones, Charlie's Angels, and numerous miniseries and television films. He was nominated for an Emmy Award for his work opposite Ann-Margret in the miniseries The Two Mrs. Grenvilles and he played John F. Kennedy in the miniseries A Woman Named Jackie, which won the Emmy for Best Miniseries. He also played the lead role opposite Lauren Hutton in the television film The Rhinemann Exchange, based on Robert Ludlum's bestselling novel.

Collins has co-starred with Diane Keaton in both The First Wives Club (1996) and Because I Said So (2007). He has co-starred with Meredith Baxter in three films, All the President's Men, A Woman Scorned: The Betty Broderick Story, and Her Final Fury: Betty Broderick, the Last Chapter, both of which were television films broadcast on CBS in 1992.

In the 2010–11 television season, Collins starred in the short-lived ABC series No Ordinary Family. On ABC's Brothers & Sisters, he played a potential love interest for Ron Rifkin's character Saul Holden. Collins appeared in season eight of The Office playing Andy Bernard's father in the episode, "Garden Party".

In 2013, Collins began appearing in the NBC series Revolution as Dr. Gene Porter, the leader of the town of Willoughby and father of Rachel Matheson (played by Elizabeth Mitchell). and in two episodes of Falling Skies in season three. Collins' final guest spots include The Fosters, Devious Maids, and Penance.

Collins also played a minor role in It’s Always Sunny in Philadelphia, as Dee and Dennis’ biological father.

Personal life 
Stephen Collins was married to Marjorie Weinman from 1970 to 1978. In 1985, he married actress Faye Grant, whom he had met on the set of Tales of the Gold Monkey in 1982.  Together they have a daughter, Kate, who was born in 1989. They separated in 2012, and, after 30 years of marriage, a final divorce decree was issued in January 2015.

Collins is an Episcopalian and a practitioner of Transcendental Meditation (TM) and has taken part in the advanced TM Yogic Flying technique since 1980. Until October 2014, he was a national co-director of the Committee for Stress-Free Schools, which advocates practicing TM in schools and funds TM research.

Sexual misconduct 
In October 2014, the New York City Police Department began investigating  Collins after an audio tape leaked to the media revealed a male voice—purported to be that of Collins—admitting to past sexual abuse of a minor under the age of 14. A Los Angeles Police Department spokesperson stated that Collins had been investigated by the department in 2012 after receiving a claim from 18 years earlier regarding sexual abuse. The LAPD further stated that its investigation did not allow it to "substantiate the allegation" against Collins.

In a December 2014 interview with People, Collins admitted he committed "inappropriate sexual conduct with three female minors" in 1973, 1982 and 1994.

Filmography

Television

Films

Discography

Published works

References

External links 
 
 Stephen Collins cast bio on The CW
 
 
 

1947 births
20th-century American male actors
20th-century American novelists
20th-century American male writers
21st-century American male actors
21st-century American musicians
American Episcopalians
American male film actors
American male novelists
American male stage actors
American male television actors
American television directors
American thriller writers
Amherst College alumni
Living people
Male actors from Des Moines, Iowa
Male actors from Iowa
Male actors from New York (state)
Musicians from Des Moines, Iowa
Novelists from Iowa
Novelists from New York (state)
People from Hastings-on-Hudson, New York
Singers from Iowa
Writers from Des Moines, Iowa